Frank B. Wilderson III (born April 11, 1956) is an American writer, dramatist, filmmaker and critic. He is a full professor of drama and African American studies at the University of California, Irvine. He received his BA in government and philosophy from Dartmouth College, his Master of Fine Arts from Columbia University and his PhD in rhetoric and film studies from the University of California, Berkeley.

Life
Wilderson was born in New Orleans, and grew up in Ann Arbor, Michigan and Minneapolis, Minnesota during the U.S. civil rights movement in the 1960s and 1970s. In his youth, Wilderson lived around or near colleges or universities as his father was a university professor. He began engaging in activism at a young age. In middle school in Chicago, where his family lived when his father was on sabbatical, he organized a civil disobedience campaign to make the Pledge of Allegiance non-mandatory at his school. When Wilderson's family moved to Berkeley, California he joined the civil rights riots there. Student activists and intellectuals were regulars in his parents' home throughout his early life, and his family was supportive of the Black Panthers.
In a Fall 2020 Dartmouth Alumni Magazine interview, Wilderson states “I came from a Minneapolis high school that was dedicated to revolution while most of the people at Dartmouth were dedicated to the upper classes in some way.”

Wilderson moved across the country to study European Philosophy and Comparative Government at Dartmouth College in September 1974 to begin his undergraduate education. Wilderson's sister Fawn Wilderson-Legos also attended the school. He continued to organize protests and engage in civil disobedience while in university and was suspended for two years after being arrested in relation to a protest against the poor conditions of immigrant construction workers there. While suspended, Wilderson worked as a labourer, freelance writer, and garbage man, hitchhiking around the U.S.

Back at Dartmouth, he participated in work at the Afro-American Society house there, was president of the Black Student Union, and a member of the historically black fraternity Alpha Phi Alpha. At Dartmouth, Wilderson also played football for the first two seasons he was there, in the position of outside linebacker.

After graduating, he worked for several years as a stockbroker in Minneapolis until returning to school to get an MFA in creative writing at Columbia University.

In the 1990s, he lived in Johannesburg, South Africa, for five years, teaching at University of Witwatersrand, Vista University, and Khanya College. There, he was one of two Americans elected to the African National Congress  in 1992 led by Nelson Mandela, and was a member of the paramilitary guerrilla group Umkhonto We Sizwe. During his time in South Africa he taught regularly at universities and helped the ANC to develop anti-apartheid propaganda.

Wilderson received an MA, and then Ph.D. in the Rhetoric Department, Film Studies Program at UC Berkeley. In Berkeley, he helped organized a protest against the arrest and trial members of the Third World Liberation Front. However, Wilderson was arrested and charged for felonies related to his actions in the protest.

Critical work
Wilderson has been described as one of the first writers in the tradition of Afro-pessimism.

In "Grammar and Ghosts: The Performative Limits of African Freedom," Wilderson asserts that the emergence of the nation(ality) is the violent grammar that originates in slavery. He writes, “No other place-names depend on such violence. No other nouns owe their integrity to this semiotics of death.” This violence gives way to a mark (“let’s face it”), where to be African, to be African American, to be Caribbean, is to be “shaped and comprised by slavery.” African descended “peoples,” share a history and a violence in every gesture and thus, Wilderson's tracing of history begins with slavery and thus, the violence that configures the “African” does not only misstep in attempting to cohere around a nationality but also fails in attempting a coherence of the identity at all.

Wilderson's writing has appeared in Social Identities; Social Justice, Les Temps Modernes, O Magazine Konch, Callaloo Obsidian II, and Paris Transcontinental.

His political memoir Incognegro: a Memoir of Exile and Apartheid chronicles his time in Johannesburg when he participated in the African National Congress and worked as a university professor there. The book ends after he returned to the US and began his graduate program at UC Berkeley. Wilderson describes the complex relationship he had to the US coming back. Incognegro won the 2008 American Book Award, and the Zora Neale Hurston/Richard Wright Legacy Award for Creative Non-Fiction, among other awards.

Dramatist work
Frank B. Wilderson III worked as a dramaturge for Lincoln Center Theater's productions of Zora Neale Hurston and Langston Hughes's Mule Bone and Mbongeni Ngema's Township Fever; and for the Market Theater in Johannesburg's production of George C. Wolfe's The Colored Museum.

Wilderson III also directed the film Reparations…...Now (2005).

Awards
 The Eisner Prize for Creative Achievement of the Highest Order
 The Judith Stronach Award for Poetry
 The Crothers Short Prose Award
 The Jerome Foundation Artists and Writers Award
 The Loft-McKnight Award for Best Prose in the State of Minnesota
 The Maya Angelou Award for Best Fiction Portraying the Black Experience in America.
 2008 American Book Award, for Incognegro

Works

Books 
 
 Red, White & Black: Cinema and the Structure of US Antagonisms (Duke University Press, 2010).
 Afropessimism (Liveright, 2020)

Selected articles 

 "Gramsci's Black Marx: Whither the Slave in Civil Society?." Social Identities 9.2 (2003): 225–240.

Anthologies

References

External links

1956 births
Living people
American filmmakers
20th-century American dramatists and playwrights
American male dramatists and playwrights
American Book Award winners
20th-century American male writers
Columbia University School of the Arts alumni
Writers from Ann Arbor, Michigan